William L. Carpenter (1854–1936) was a member of the Michigan Supreme Court from 1902 until 1904.  Carpenter was born in Lake Orion, Michigan.  He studied at what is now Michigan State University and then went to the University of Michigan Law School.

From 1878-1894 Carpenter practiced law in Detroit.  In the latter year he was elected to the Third Judicial Circuit of Michigan.

Sources
biography of William Carpenter

1854 births
People from Lake Orion, Michigan
Michigan State University alumni
University of Michigan Law School alumni
Michigan state court judges
1936 deaths
Justices of the Michigan Supreme Court